The Deep End is a 2001 American thriller film written and directed by David Siegel and Scott McGehee.  It stars Tilda Swinton, Goran Visnjic, Jonathan Tucker and Josh Lucas and was released by Fox Searchlight Pictures. The film was very loosely adapted from the novel The Blank Wall by Elisabeth Sanxay Holding (filmed before by Max Ophüls as The Reckless Moment).  The film premiered in competition at the Sundance Film Festival where English cinematographer Giles Nuttgens won the Best Cinematography award.

Plot
Margaret Hall (Tilda Swinton) and her family live an upper middle class life in Tahoe City, California. Her husband is a pilot on the aircraft carrier USS Constellation. She is startled to discover that her son Beau (Jonathan Tucker), a high school senior, has been having a sexual affair with 30-year-old Reno, Nevada, night club owner Darby Reese (Josh Lucas). Margaret visits Reese's nightclub, The Deep End, to demand that he stay away from her son. That night, Reese secretly visits Beau and the two meet in the boathouse. Beau confronts him about asking his mother for money. The two argue, eventually coming to blows. As Beau returns to the house, Reese leans on a railing, causing it to collapse, and falls into the water, impaling himself on an anchor.

The next morning, Margaret discovers Reese's body on the beach. Margaret removes the body and dumps it in a cove but it is soon discovered and the police investigate it as a homicide.  Soon after, a man named Alek Spera (Goran Višnjić) confronts Margaret with a tape of Darby and Beau having sex. Alek demands $50,000 in 24 hours or he will turn the tape over to the police, which would implicate Beau in Reese's "murder".

Margaret struggles unsuccessfully to get the money by selling all her jewels. Alek calls Margaret the next day and tells her that she needs to get only $25,000 but Alek's partner, Nagle (Raymond J. Barry) is convinced she is lying about not being able to raise the money. Nagle corners and beats Margaret but Alek arrives and the two men scuffle, and Alek strangles Nagle. Margaret attempts to take responsibility for Nagle's death, but Alek takes the body away in Nagle's car. As Margaret and her son drive looking for Nagle's car, they see it overturned in a ditch. Margaret attempts to free Alek, who is critically injured. Alek pleads with her to leave before the police arrive. Margaret stays until Alek dies. 

Back at home, Margaret, in a state of distress, is comforted by Beau. Another phone call is heard coming in from the absent husband, answered by Beau's sister. The Halls' normal life resumes.

Cast
 Tilda Swinton as Margaret Hall
 Goran Višnjić as Alek Spera
 Jonathan Tucker as Beau Hall
 Peter Donat as Jack Hall
 Josh Lucas as Darby Reese
 Raymond J. Barry as Carlie Nagle
 Tamara Hope as Paige Hal
 Jordon Dorrance as Dylan Hall
 Holmes Osborne as Loan Officer

Reception
The Deep End received positive reviews from critics and put actress Tilda Swinton on Hollywood's radar. Despite years of previous credits, it is considered her breakout role. Currently, it holds an 82% rating on Rotten Tomatoes based on 116 reviews. On Metacritic, the film had an average score of 78 out of 100, based on 27 reviews from film critics, indicating "generally favorable reviews".

References

External links

 
 

2001 crime drama films
2001 independent films
2001 LGBT-related films
2001 films
American crime drama films
American independent films
American LGBT-related films
2000s English-language films
Films based on American novels
Films based on crime novels
Fox Searchlight Pictures films
Gay-related films
American neo-noir films
2001 drama films
Films about mother–son relationships
LGBT-related drama films
2000s American films